Alilah (also Romanized as Alīlah; also known as Ālāyl and Ālāylah) is a village in Ani Rural District, in the Central District of Germi County, Ardabil Province, Iran. At the 2006 census, its population was 430, in 90 families.

References 

Towns and villages in Germi County